The Directorate  Naval Tactical and Weapons Policy originally called the Tactical Section was a directorate of the British Admiralty, and later of the Naval Staff, Ministry of Defence, (Navy Department). Dating from 1920 it operated until 1939 before being abolished. It was revived in 1958 and existed until 1968. The naval staff directorate was administered by the Director, Directorate  Naval Tactical and Weapons Policy.

History
In 1920 reorganization of the Naval Staff led to the Assistant Chief of Naval Staff becoming responsible for tactical policy and including ships and weapons development this led to the creation of a tactical section which he superintended. In December 1928 it absorbed the some of the Torpedo Division and continued to function until 1939 at the beginning of World War Two when it was abolished. The division was reformed under a new name the Tactical and Weapons Policy Division in 1958. It survived the merger of the Admiralty into the Ministry of Defence in April 1964 until 1965 when its name was changed again to the Directorate Naval Tactical and Weapons Policy but now it was part of the Naval Staff, Ministry of Defence, (Navy Department). The directorate continued to operate until 1968 when it was abolished.

Director of Tactical Division
Included:
 Captain Alfred H.Taylor: February 1925-January 1927 
 Captain Bruce A. Fraser: January 1927-December 1928 
 Captain Henry G. Thursfield: December 1928-May 1930 
 Captain Charles D.Burke: May 1930-May 1932 
 Captain John G. Crace: May 1932-May 1934 
 Captain Denis W.Boyd: May 1934-January 1936 
 Captain Colin Cantlie: January 1936-January 1938 
 Captain Douglas A.Budgen: January 1938-May 1939

Directors of Tactical and Weapon Policy
Included:
 Captain Maurice J. Ross: February 1958-September 1959
 Rear-Admiral Hugh C. Martell: September 1959 – 1962
 Captain H. Richard B. Janvrin: March 1962-December 1963
 Captain Terence T. Lewin: December 1963-December 1965

Director of Naval Tactical Weapons Policy
 Captain Ian Easton: December 1965 – 1968

Citations

Sources
 

 Admiralty, Great Britain (February 1968). "Admiralty:Naval Staff Divisions". Navy List. London England: HM Stationery Office.   
 Friedman, Norman (2011). British Cruisers: Two World Wars and After. Barnsley, England: Seaforth Publishing. .  
 Heathcoate, Tony A. (2002). British admirals of the fleet 1734-1995 : a biographical dictionary. Barnsley, England: Pen and Sword.  
 Government, HM (1968). "Supplement to the London Gazette: Ministry of Defence (Navy Department)" (PDF). www.thegazette.co.uk. The London Gazette. 
 Mackie, Colin (January 2018). "Royal Navy Senior Appointments" (PDF). gulabin.com. C. Mackie.    
 Sainsbury, A. B. (25 February 1999). "Obituary: Vice-Admiral Sir Hugh Martell". The Independent.

Admiralty departments
Naval Staff Directorates of the Ministry of Defence (United Kingdom)
Military units and formations established in 1925
Military units and formations disestablished in 1968